Lars Simonsen (born 19 September 1963) is a Danish actor.

He graduated from Aarhus Teater in 1990. In theatre roles, he has appeared at Odense Teater, Husets Teater and Betty Nansen Teatret, among others.

Plays he has worked on include Snart kommer tiden, Den gerrige, Hagbard og Signe, Maskerade, Pinocchios aske, Helligtrekongers aften and Primadonnaer på prøve.

Lars Simonsen won the Robert Prize for best actor in 1985 and 1998 for the films Tro, håb og kærlighed and Barbara. He won the award for Best Actor at the 14th Moscow International Film Festival for his role in Twist and Shout.

From TV, he is best known from the series , but he has also had a role in Mordkommisjonen.

Filmography

Films

Television

References

External links 
 

1963 births
Best Actor Robert Award winners
Danish male film actors
Danish male television actors
Living people
People from Odense